Qingshuihe County (Mongolian:     Чин шүи хе сиыан Čiŋ šüi hė siyan) is a county of Inner Mongolia Autonomous Region, North China, it is under the administration of the prefecture-level city of Hohhot, the capital of the autonomous region, bordering Shanxi province to the south and east.

Chinese media reports said the scheme would have cost more than $6b yuan ($880m, £610m) in total, many times more than the county government's annual expenditure. The council expected either local, regional or national help to complete the project, but this was not approved. In 2007, money for the project ran out, and development stopped, leaving both a half-developed and unoccupied city, as well as a lack of finances and resource to maintain the existing town.

Climate

References

External links
www.xzqh.org 

County-level divisions of Inner Mongolia